Rafi (also Romanized as Rafī‘; also known as Qal‘eh Rafī‘) is a village in Beshiva Pataq Rural District, in the Central District of Sarpol-e Zahab County, Kermanshah Province, Iran. At the 2006 census, its population was 522, in 112 families.

References 

Populated places in Sarpol-e Zahab County